The Phoenicians were the first known immigrant population to colonise the region of present-day Tunisia. Their city of Carthage grew to importance in the first millennium BC, when it vied with Rome for western Mediterranean dominance. Between 264 and 146 BC, Rome and Carthage waged the Punic Wars, with the ultimate victory going to Rome. The Romans occupied Tunisia for most of the next 800 years, until they were supplanted by Arab invaders during the early Islamic conquests of 647–697 AD. The expansion of the Ottoman Empire in the 15th and 16th centuries included the annexation of Tunisia in 1574. In 1881, Tunisia was occupied by France and as a French protectorate was the scene of several battles between Allied and Axis forces during World War II.

Ancient Times

Carthaginian Empire
264 — 146 BCE Punic Wars
264 — 241 BCE First Punic War

Early 255 BCE Siege of Aspis
Early 255 BCE Battle of Adys
255 BCE Battle of Tunis
240 — 238 BCE Mercenary War
Spring 240 BCE Battle of Utica
Autumn 240 BCE Battle of the Bagradas River
Autumn 240 BCE Hamilcar's victory with Navaras
238 BCE Battle of "The Saw"
238 BCE Siege of Tunis
218 — 201 BCE Second Punic War

203 BCE Battle of Utica
203 BCE Battle of the Great Plains
October 19, 202 BCE Battle of Zama
149 — 146 BCE Third Punic War
147 BCE Battle of the Port of Carthage
147 BCE Battle of Nepheris
circa 149 BCE — Spring 146 BCE Battle of Carthage

Kingdom of Numidia
112 - 106 BCE Jugurthine War
111 - 104 BCE  Battle of Thala
110 BCE Battle of Suthul
108 BCE Battle of the Muthul

Roman Province of Africa
238 CE Battle of Carthage
439 CE Genseric chose to break the treaty between the Vandals and the Romans when he invaded the province of Africa Proconsularis and laid siege to Carthage.
Germanic Wars
468 CE Battle of Cap Bon

Medieval Times

Vandal Kingdom
June 533 — March 534 Vandalic War

September 13, 533 Battle of Ad Decimum
December 15, 533 Battle of Tricamarum

Byzantine Praetorian prefecture of Africa
The Moorish Wars
534 First Moorish uprising
536 Military mutiny
544 Second Moorish uprising and the revolt of Guntharic
577 Conflict with Moorish kingdom of Garmul

Byzantine Exarchate of Africa
647 — 709 Muslim conquest of the Maghreb

698 Battle of Carthage

Aghlabids
 824–836: military mutiny
 879–880: Invasion of al-Abbas ibn Ahmad ibn Tulun

Fatimid Caliphate
909: Fatimd conquest of Ifriqiya from the Aghlabids
943–947: Rebellion of Abu Yazid

Almohad Caliphate
1160 All of Ifriqiya conquered and annexed by the Almohads

1171 — 1172 Conquest of North Africa and Nubia by the Ayyubid Dynasty

Ayyubid dynasty
1171 — 1172 Conquest of North Africa and Nubia by the Ayyubid Dynasty

Hafsid dynasty
1269 Eighth Crusade

Modern Times

Ottoman Eyalet of Tunus
1526 — 1791 Ottoman–Habsburg wars
August 16, 1534 Conquest of Tunis
June 1535 Conquest of Tunis
July 12, 1574 — September 13, 1574 Conquest of Tunis

French protectorate of Tunisia

September 1, 1939 — September 2, 1945 World War II
June 10, 1940 — May 2, 1945 Mediterranean and Middle East theatre of World War II
June 10, 1940 — May 13, 1943 North African Campaign
November 17, 1942 — May 13, 1943 Tunisia Campaign
November 10, 1942 — December 25, 1942 Run for Tunis
February 1943 — May 1943 Battle of Sedjenane
February 14, 1943 — February 17, 1943 Battle of Sidi Bou Zid
February 19, 1943 — February 25, 1943 Battle of the Kasserine Pass
March 6, 1943 Battle of Medenine
March 16, 1943 — March 27, 1943 Operation Pugilist
March 23, 1943 — April 3, 1943 Battle of El Guettar
April 5, 1943 — April 27, 1943 Operation Flax
April 6, 1943 — April 7, 1943 Battle of Wadi Akarit
April 27, 1943 — May 1, 1943 Battle of Hill 609
May 6, 1943 — May 12, 1943 Operation Vulcan
May 8, 1943 — May 13, 1943 Operation Retribution
1952 — 1956 Tunisian independence

Kingdom of Tunisia
1952 — 1956 Tunisian independence

Republic of Tunisia
July 19, 1961 — July 23, 1961 Bizerte crisis
December 18, 2010 — January 14, 2011 Tunisian revolution
June 26, 2015 — ongoing ISIL insurgency in Tunisia

References

Sources

See also
Tunisia
List of wars involving Tunisia
Tunisian Armed Forces
Tunisian Land Army
Tunisian Navy
Tunisian Air Force
Military history of Africa
African military systems to 1,800 C.E.
African military systems 1,800 C.E. — 1,900 C.E.
African military systems after 1,900 C.E.

Military history of Tunisia
Conflicts